The Fivemile Rapids Site (Smithsonian trinomial: 35 WS 4), is an archaeological site near The Dalles, Oregon, United States. Yielding remains beginning soon after the end of the last glacial period, this and other nearby sites provide a nearly continuous record of human occupation from at least 9000 BCE to 1820 CE. It also provides some of the earliest available evidence of fishing in human economy.

The site was added to the National Register of Historic Places in 1974.

See also
National Register of Historic Places listings in Wasco County, Oregon

References

Archaeological sites on the National Register of Historic Places in Oregon
National Register of Historic Places in Wasco County, Oregon